A by-election was held for the New South Wales Legislative Assembly electorate of Petersham on 22 March 1919 because of the resignation of John Cohen who had accepted an appointment as a Judge of the District Court. H. V. Evatt alleges that this was part of a deal between William Holman and the Liberals that had led to the Nationalist government in 1917.

Dates

Result

The by-election was caused by resignation of John Cohen who had accepted an appointment as a Judge of the District Court.

See also
Electoral results for the district of Petersham
List of New South Wales state by-elections

Notes

References

1919 elections in Australia
New South Wales state by-elections
1910s in New South Wales